German submarine U-351 was a Type VIIC U-boat of Nazi Germany's Kriegsmarine during World War II.

She carried out no patrols. She did not sink or damage any ships.

She was scuttled on 5 May 1945 in northern Germany.

Design
German Type VIIC submarines were preceded by the shorter Type VIIB submarines. U-351 had a displacement of  when at the surface and  while submerged. She had two shafts and two  propellers.

U-351 was fitted with five  torpedo tubes (four fitted at the bow and one at the stern), fourteen torpedoes, one  SK C/35 naval gun, 220 rounds, and a  C/30 anti-aircraft gun. The boat had a complement of between forty-four and sixty.

Service history
The submarine was laid down on 4 March 1940 at the Flensburger Schiffbau-Gesellschaft yard at Flensburg as yard number 470, launched on 27 March 1941 and commissioned on 20 June under the command of Oberleutnant zur See Karl Hause.

She served with the 26th U-boat Flotilla from 20 June 1941, the 24th flotilla from 1 April 1942, the 22nd flotilla from 1 July 1944 and the 4th flotilla from 1 March 1945. All these assignments were for employment as a training or school boat. U-351 was scuttled on 5 May 1945 in Horup Haff, (east of Flensburg). The wreck was broken up in 1948.

References

Bibliography

External links

German Type VIIC submarines
U-boats commissioned in 1941
1941 ships
Ships built in Flensburg
World War II submarines of Germany
Operation Regenbogen (U-boat)
Maritime incidents in May 1945